Government Elementary Teacher Education Institute (GETEI CHIKITI) is a teacher training institute in southern Odisha. It was established in 1889 by NCRT, Government Of India Education and Research Ministry.

References

Colleges of education in India
Universities and colleges in Odisha
Ganjam district
1880s establishments in India
Educational institutions established in the 1880s